Ivan Ivanavich Antanovich (born 3 April 1937) is a Belarusian sociologist, linguist, political scientist, philosopher, diplomat, and politician. He was a professor of sociology in 1973 and a doctorate for Doktor nauk in 1977. He is a founder of the Republican Party of Labour and Justice. He was the Minister of Foreign Affairs for Belarus from 1997 to 1998. He speaks fluent Belarusian, Russian and English.

Personal life 
He was born in the village of Damašy in the Second Polish Republic in 1937. He graduated from the Kazan Federal University in Russia. In 1969, he was working at the Secretariat in the United Nations in the UNESCO. In 1977, he was a head secretary of Minsk City CPB and later was the head of Culture and Department of Communist Party of Byelorussia. rom 1990 to 1991 - Deputy Head of the Department of the Central Committee of links with social and political organizations. From 1990 to 1991 he was the member of the Political Bureau of the Communist Party of the RSFSR. From 1990 to 1991, he was the Secretary of the Communist Party of the RSFSR Relations socio-political organizations. From 1991 to 1993 he worked in the international non-governmental research and educational organization "Rau-Corporation." He served as the Deputy Minister of Foreign Affairs of the Republic of Belarus from 1996 to 1997. He is married and has two children.

References 

1937 births
Living people
People from Lyakhavichy District
People from Nowogródek Voivodeship (1919–1939)
Kazan Federal University alumni
Communist Party of the Soviet Union members
Communist Party of Byelorussia politicians
Republican Party of Labour and Justice politicians
Foreign ministers of Belarus
Belarusian diplomats
Belarusian philosophers
Linguists from Belarus
Belarusian sociologists
Permanent Delegates of Belarus to UNESCO